Jurgis Usinavičius (real name Napalys Augulis; born 27 March 1932 in Pimpičkų rural area, Skapiškis district) – Lithuanian journalist, editor, publicist and writer.

Biography 
1959 Finished secondary agricultural school in Siauliai, Lithuania. In 1973 – studied in Lithuanian Academy of Agriculture. In
1945, his parents (Alfonsas Augulis and Kazimera) with all children had been deported to Komi. In 1947 he fled back to Lithuania under other person's name – Jurgis Usinavičius. Unlike his brother, Alfonsas Vytautas Augulis, Napalys stayed under different name during Soviet Union and stays nowadays. in 1991. In Siauliai Napalys finished secondary agricultural school in 1959 and Lithuanian Academy of Agriculture in 1973.

1959–1967 Worked in Siauliai district newspaper "Leninietis" (i.e., Leninist) as censorship clerk and head of agricultural department.
1967–1999 Worked in magazine Our Gardens ("Mūsų sodai"). Been head of editorial department, chief secretary, deputy chief editor.

He wrote more than 600 articles, reports, essays; mainly about agriculture and other public issues. During Soviet Union Era Napalys (under Jurgis Usinavicius name) freely maintained relationship with the rest of Augulis family and was a member of Communist Party. In independent Lithuania Jurgis indirectly took part in politics of Lithuania.

2015 Napalys (Jurgis) becomes president of Exiles and Emigrants Repatriation Fund "Vytis" (Tremtinių ir išeivių grįžimo į tėvynę fondas "Vytis", translated to English as chase, pursue). The fund is supposed to help return those Lithuanians who still live in Ural, Russia, and those who emigrated to work and live abroad in European Union, especially England.

Bibliography 
 Kuršėnų tarybinis ūkis (Kursenai Soviet economy), 1968
 I. Mičiurino vaismedžių medelynas (I. Michiurin's tree nursery), 1973
 Matau tavo vardą (I See Your ID), story. Vilnius: Aklųjų leidykla (Blinds publishing house), 1983
 Išskridusios bitės (Scattered Bees), novel about lost relatives and nationals. Vilnius: Žiedai, 1995
 Akmenėjantis angelas (Petrified Angel), novel. Vilnius: Žiedai, 1998
 Amžių dialogas (Dialogue of Ages), novel. Vilnius: Žiedai, 2001
 Karalių kaimas (Kings Village), novel. Vilnius: J. Usinavičius, 2004 
 Likimai (Fates), historical novel. Vilnius: Žiedai, 2004 
 Vaikystės žvyrkeliai (Childhood Dirty [Gravel] Roads), romance novels for children. Vilnius: Spauda, 2006

Rating 
BELLADI competition winner: 1975 – Vilnius, 1977 – Tallinn, 1978 – Minsk.

References

External links 
Ivdel – location of concentration camp in Soviet Union where Napalys' father spent many years after World War II.
Back from Syberia
Akmenėjantis angelas (Petrified Angel) OpenLibrary link
Amžių dialogas (Dialogue of Ages) link
Išskridusios bitės (Scattered Bees)

1932 births
Living people
Lithuanian journalists